The Allison T56 is an American single-shaft, modular design military turboprop with a 14-stage axial flow compressor driven by a four-stage turbine. It was originally developed by the Allison Engine Company for the Lockheed C-130 Hercules transport entering production in 1954. It has been a Rolls-Royce product since 1995 when Allison was acquired by Rolls-Royce. The commercial version is designated 501-D. Over 18,000 engines have been produced since 1954, logging over 200 million flying hours.

Design and development

The T56 turboprop, evolved from Allison's previous T38 series, was first flown in the nose of a B-17 test-bed aircraft in 1954. One of the first flight-cleared YT-56 engines was installed in a C-130 nacelle on Lockheed's Super Constellation test aircraft in early 1954. Originally fitted to the Lockheed C-130 Hercules military transport aircraft, the T56 was also installed on the Lockheed P-3 Orion maritime patrol aircraft (MPA), Grumman E-2 Hawkeye airborne early warning (AEW) aircraft, and Grumman C-2 Greyhound carrier onboard delivery (COD) aircraft, as well as civilian airliners such as the Lockheed Electra and the Convair 580.

The T56-A-1 delivered to Lockheed in May, 1953, produced only , compared to the required  for the YC-130A. Evolution of the T56 has been achieved through increases in pressure ratio and turbine temperature. The T56-A-14 installed on the P-3 Orion has a  rating with a pressure ratio of 9.25:1 while the T56-A-427 fitted to the E-2 Hawkeye has a  rating and a 12:1 pressure ratio. In addition, the T56 produces approximately  residual thrust from its exhaust.

Over the years, there have been a number of engine development versions, which are grouped by series numbers. The Series II and III derivatives were developed under military component improvement programs (CIP). By 1965, Allison was proposing the development of Series IV derivatives, but in 1968, the United States Congress restricted CIP work to reliability and maintainability improvements instead of performance improvements. The Series IV derivatives were finally developed in the 1980s after being approved for a U.S. Air Force engine model derivative program (EMDP) in the 1979 fiscal year budget. Series IV engines include the Air Force EMDP T56-A-100 demonstrator, model T56-A-101 for the Air Force's C-130 aircraft, T56-A-427 for NAVAIR's E-2C and C-2A aircraft, 501-D39 for the Lockheed L-100 aircraft, and the 501-K34 marine turboshaft for NAVSEA.

The Lockheed Martin C-130J Super Hercules which first flew in 1996, has the T56 replaced by the Rolls-Royce AE 2100, which uses dual FADECs (Full Authority Digital Engine Control) to control the engines and propellers. It drives six-bladed scimitar propellers from Dowty Rotol.

The T56 Series 3.5, an engine enhancement program to reduce fuel consumption and decrease temperatures, was approved in 2013 for the National Oceanic and Atmospheric Administration (NOAA) WP-3D "Hurricane Hunter" aircraft. After eight years of development and marketing efforts by Rolls-Royce, the T56 Series 3.5 was also approved in 2015 for engine retrofits on the U.S. Air Force's legacy C-130 aircraft that were currently in service with T56 Series III engines. As part of the T56 Series 3.5 upgrade, parts from the T56 Series IV engine (such as the compressor seals) and the uncooled turbine blades from the AE 1107C turboshaft would be retrofit into existing T56 Series III casing installations. Propeller upgrades to eight-bladed NP2000 propellers from UTC Aerospace Systems have been applied to the E-2 Hawkeye, C-2 Greyhound, and older-model C-130 Hercules aircraft, and will be adopted on the P-3 Orion.

Production of the T56 engine is expected to continue to at least 2026, with the U.S. Naval Air Systems Command (NAVAIR) order in 2019 of 24 additional E-2D Advanced Hawkeyes (AHEs) powered by the T56-A-427A engine variant.

Experimental and non-turboprop uses
The T56/Model 501 engine has been used in a number of experimental efforts, and as something other than a turboprop powerplant. In early 1960, two Allison YT56-A-6 experimental turbine engines without propellers were added next to existing propulsion engines on flight tests of a Lockheed NC-130B 58-0712 aircraft. The YT56-A-6 produced pressurized air for blowing over control surfaces to demonstrate boundary layer control (BLC), which helped to enable short takeoff and landing (STOL) performance. In 1963, Lockheed and Allison designed another STOL demonstrator, this time for a U.S. Army requirement. Lockheed internal designation GL298-7 involved a C-130E Hercules that was re-engined with  501-M7B turboprops.

In 1963, an aeroderivative line of industrial gas turbines based on the T56 was introduced in under the 501-K name. The 501-K is offered as a single-shaft version for constant speed applications and as a two-shaft version for variable-speed, high-torque applications. Series II standard turbines included the natural gas-fueled 501-K5 and the liquid-fueled 501-K14. The air-cooled Series III turbines included the natural gas-fueled 501-K13 and the liquid-fueled 501-K15. A marinized turboshaft version of the 501-K is used to generate electrical power onboard all the U.S. Navy's cruisers and almost all of its destroyers.

During the late 1960s, the U.S. Navy funded the development of the T56-A-18 engine, which introduced a new gearbox compared with the early gearbox on the T56-A-7. The 50-hour preliminary flight rating test (PFRT) was completed for the T56-A-18 in 1968. In the early 1970s, Boeing Vertol selected Allison (at that time known as the Detroit Diesel Allison Division (DDAD) of General Motors) to power a dynamic-system test rig (DSTR) supporting the development of its XCH-62 heavy-lift helicopter (HLH) program for the U.S. Army, using the Allison 501-M62B turboshaft engine. The 501-M62B had a 13-stage compressor based on the 501-M24 demonstrator engine, which was a fixed single-shaft engine with an increased overall pressure ratio and a variable-geometry compressor, and it had an annular combustor based on the T56-A-18 and other development programs. The turbine was derived from the fixed single-shaft T56, which had a four-stage section in which the first two stages provided enough power to drive the compressor, and the other two stages offered enough power to drive the propeller shaft. For the double-shaft 501-M62B engine, it was split into a two-stage turbine driving the compressor, where the turbine stages had air-cooled blades and vanes, and a two-stage free power turbine driving the propeller through a gearbox. After DSTR testing was successful, the 501-M62B engine was further developed into the XT701-AD-700 engine for use on the HLH. The  XT701 passed the tests required to enter ground and flight testing on the HLH, but funding of the HLH program was canceled in August 1975, when the triple-turbine, tandem-rotor helicopter prototype had reached 95% completion.

The only major changes made for the 570-K were the elimination of compressor bleed air and replacing the XT701's titanium compressor case with a steel case. The 570-K was then adapted to the  501-M78B demonstration engine, which Lockheed flew on a Grumman Gulfstream II as part of the NASA Propfan Test Assessment Program in the late 1980s. The 501-M78B had the same 13-stage compressor, combustor, 2-stage gas producer turbine, and 2-stage free power turbine used on the XT701 and 570-K, but it was connected through a 6.797 reduction ratio gearbox to a  Hamilton Standard single-rotation propfan, containing propfan blades that were swept back 45 degrees at the tips.

Variants

The T56 has been developed extensively throughout its production run, the many variants are described by the manufacturer as belonging to four main series groups.

Initial civil variants (Series I) were designed and produced by the Allison Engine Company as the 501-D and powered the Lockheed C-130 Hercules. Later variants (Series II, III, and IV) and the Series 3.5 engine enhancement kit gave increased performance through design refinements.

Further derivatives of the 501-D/T56 were produced as turboshafts for helicopters including a variant designated T701 that was developed for the canceled Boeing Vertol XCH-62 project.

Applications

Specifications (T56 Series IV)

See also

References

Bibliography

External links

 T56 page at Rolls-Royce website

1950s turboprop engines
T56